Elections to Mid Bedfordshire District Council were held on 4 May 1995. All 53 seats were up for election.

Result 
Gains and losses in the results table are compared with the 1991 district council election.

Ward Results 
All results are listed below:

Figures on turnout were taken from Plymouth University's Elections Centre, which gives the number of registered voters, and the percentage turnout for each ward.  The number of ballots cast for each ward was calculated from these.  Percentage change in turnout is compared with the same ward in the 1991 District Council election.

The percentage of the vote for each candidate was calculated compared with the number of ballots cast in the ward.  Note that in a ward with more than one seat, voters were allowed to place as many crosses on the ballot paper as seats.  The percentage change for each candidate is compared with the same candidate in the 1991 District Council election.

Candidates who were members of the council before the election are marked with an asterisk.

Ampthill

Arlesey

Aspley

Biggleswade Ivel

Biggleswade Stratton

Blunham

Campton & Meppershall

Clifton & Henlow

Clophill

Cranfield

Flitton, Greenfield & Pulloxhill

Flitwick East

Flitwick West

Harlington

Haynes & Houghton Conquest

Langford

Marston

Maulden

Northill

Old Warden & Southill

Potton

Sandy All Saints

Sandy St Swithuns

Shefford

Shillington & Stondon

Stotfold

Wensley

Westoning

Woburn

Wrest

Notes

References 

1995
1995 English local elections